was a town located in Asakuchi District, Okayama Prefecture, Japan.

As of 2003, the town had an estimated population of 6,529 and a density of 724.64 persons per km2. The total area was 9.01 km2.

On March 21, 2006, Yorishima, along with the towns of Kamogata and Konkō (all from Asakuchi District), was merged to create the city of Asakuchi.

Dissolved municipalities of Okayama Prefecture